Houston is a city in the U.S. state of Texas.

Houston may also refer to:

Places

United States

 Houston, Alabama, an unincorporated community
 Houston, Alaska, a city
 Houston, Arkansas, a town
 Houston, Delaware, a town
 Houston, Florida, a place in Suwannee County
 Houston, Georgia, an unincorporated community
 Houston, Indiana, an unincorporated community
 Houston, Minnesota, a city
 Houston, Mississippi, a city
 Houston, Missouri, a city
 Houston, Nebraska, an unincorporated community 
 Houston, North Carolina, an unincorporated community 
 Houston, Ohio, an unincorporated community
 Houston, Pennsylvania, a borough
 Houston, Tennessee, an unincorporated community
 Lake Houston, Texas, a reservoir and primary municipal water supply for the city of Houston
 North Houston (disambiguation)
 Houston County (disambiguation)
 Houston station (disambiguation)
 Houston Street (disambiguation)
 Houston Township (disambiguation)

Elsewhere 
 Houston, British Columbia, a town in Canada
 Houston, Renfrewshire, a village in Scotland

People
 Sam Houston, Texan politician and statesman, for whom the city of Houston, Texas was named
 Whitney Houston, American singer and actress
 Houston (surname)
 Houston (given name)
 Clan Houston, a Scottish clan
 Houston (actress), American pornographic actress
 Houston (singer), R&B singer Houston Edward Summers IV (born 1983)

Music
 Houston (album), a 1965 album by Dean Martin
 "Houston" (song), a track on the album written by Lee Hazlewood
 Houston (I'm Comin' to See You), 1974 album by Glen Campbell, with corresponding song as its lead track
 "Houston (Means I'm One Day Closer to You)", a 1983 song by Larry Gatlin and The Gatlin Brothers Band
 "Houston", a song from the 1998 album El Oso by Soul Coughing
 "Houston", a 2008 song from Accelerate by R.E.M.
 "Houston", a 2008 song by Snob Scrilla

Schools
 University of Houston, Houston, Texas
 Houston Cougars, the athletic teams for the university
 Houston Baptist University, Houston Texas
 Houston Baptist Huskies, the athletic teams for the university
 Houston Community College, in several Texas cities
 Houston High School (disambiguation)
 Houston Academy for International Studies, Houston, Texas

Tournaments
 Shell Houston Open, a golf tournament on the PGA Tour
 Houston Open (early PGA Tour), played from 1922 to 1938
 Houston Open (darts)

Other uses
 , various US Navy ships
 Houston's Restaurant, a steakhouse chain
 Houston instruments, a company
 Houston, the radio call sign for NASA's Christopher C. Kraft Jr. Mission Control Center
 "Houston, we have a problem", a quote by astronaut Jack Swigert
 The Houstons: On Our Own, a 2012 American documentary television series about Whitney Houston's family

See also
 Lucy, Lady Houston (1857–1936), British philanthropist, suffragette and political activist
 Heuston, a surname
 Hoston, Trøndelag, a village in Trøndelag county, Norway
 Houstoun, a surname
 Huston (disambiguation)